The Book Agent is a 1917 American silent comedy film directed by Otis Turner and starring George Walsh, Doris Pawn, and William Burress.

Cast
 George Walsh as Harry Kelly 
 Doris Pawn as Mollie Lester 
 William Burress as Crandall Barker 
 Reginald Everett as Dana Sneed 
 Willard Louis as Rev. A. Ginem 
 Josef Swickard as Dr. Newdope 
 Velma Whitman as Mollie's Mother 
 Phil Gastrockas The Lawyer

References

Bibliography
 Solomon, Aubrey. The Fox Film Corporation, 1915-1935: A History and Filmography. McFarland, 2011.

External links
 

1917 films
1917 comedy films
1910s English-language films
American silent feature films
Silent American comedy films
American black-and-white films
Films directed by Otis Turner
Fox Film films
1910s American films